Mark Landon (born 1 February 1983), better known by his stage name M-Phazes, is an Australian-born producer based in LA. He has produced records for Logic, Demi Lovato, Madonna, Eminem, Kehlani, Zara Larsson, Remi Wolf, Kiiara, Noah Cyrus, and Cautious Clay. He produced and wrote Eminem’s “Bad Guy” off 2015’s Grammy Winner for Best Rap Album of the Year “The Marshall Mathers LP 2.” He produced and wrote “Sober” by Demi Lovato, “playinwitme” by KYLE ft. Kehlani, “Adore” by Amy Shark, “I Got So High That I Saw Jesus” by Noah Cyrus, and “Painkiller” by Ruel ft Denzel Curry.

M-Phazes developed and produced Kimbra, KYLE, Amy Shark, and Ruel before they broke. He put his energy into Ruel beginning at age 13 and guided him to RCA. M-Phazes produced Amy Shark’s successful songs including “Love Songs Ain't for Us,” co-written by Ed Sheeran. He worked extensively with KYLE before he broke and remains one of his main producers. In 2017, M-Phazes was nominated for Producer of the Year at the APRA Awards alongside Flume. In 2018 he won 5 ARIA Awards including Producer of the Year. His recent releases are with Remi Wolf, VanJess, and Kiiara.

Cautious Clay, Keith Urban, Travis Barker, Nas, Pusha T, Anne-Marie, Kehlani, Alison Wonderland, Lupe Fiasco, Alessia Cara, Joey Bada$$, Wiz Khalifa, Teyana Taylor, and Wale have all featured on tracks M-Phazes produced.

Early life

M-Phazes was born on 1 February 1983. He went to Miami High School on the Gold Coast and lived in Burleigh Heads, Queensland.

Career

2008: One Stop Shop 

In 2008, Mark Landon was the winner of Sha Money XL's 'One Stop Shop' beat battle in Phoenix, Arizona. The competition was judged by producers such as Swizz Beats (Jay Z, Alicia Keys), DJ Premier (Nas, Christina Aguilera) and Denaun Porter (Eminem, D12). His win at One Stop would lead to producing for Contemporary R&B superstar Amerie.

2009: Flying Colors and Running On Air 

M-Phazes reached gold sales for the first time in 2009 with Bliss n Eso's album Flying Colours, of which he produced seven songs, and reached his first platinum sales in 2010 with Bliss n Eso's album Running On Air.

2010: Signing to Mushroom Music/Obese Records and Good Gracious 

In 2010, M-Phazes signed a publishing deal with Mushroom Records and record deal with Obese Records, later releasing his debut album Good Gracious featuring Bliss n Eso, Drapht, Illy, Phrase and many other Australian hip hop artists. Good Gracious won an ARIA Award for Best Urban Release, beating Bliss n Eso's Running On Air of which he produced seven songs.

2011: Kimbra's Vows 

M-Phazes was enlisted by Kimbra in 2011 to co-produce her platinum debut album Vows. Vows won Best Pop Album and Album of the Year in the New Zealand Music Awards.

2013: Universal Music Publishing and "Bad Guy" 

2013 saw M-Phazes sign a worldwide deal with Universal Music Publishing Group and land his first major placement with "Bad Guy", which was the intro track on Eminem's eighth album The Marshall Mathers LP 2.

2014: Illy's "Tightrope" and Cinematic 

In 2014 M-Phazes produced his first platinum selling single with Illy's "Tightrope" taken from the gold-selling album Cinematic, which was executive produced by M-Phazes.
 
M-Phazes then worked with Keyshia Cole, 2 Chainz, Daniel Johns, Luke Steele, Kimbra, Illy, Guy Sebastian, Thelma Plum, Meg Mac and Hopium.

He also produced the 2014 song "Don't Wanna Fall in Love" by singer/rapper Kyle.

2015: Grammy and APRA Awards 

M-Phazes received a Grammy award for his co-production work on the track "Bad Guy" from Eminem's album The Marshall Mathers LP 2. The album received the 2015 Grammy award for Best Rap Album.

He also received the 2015 Urban Work of the Year APRA award for his co-production on the track "Tightrope" taken from Illy's album Cinematic.

Awards and nominations

AIR Awards
The Australian Independent Record Awards (commonly known informally as AIR Awards) is an annual awards night to recognise, promote and celebrate the success of Australia's Independent Music sector.

|-
| AIR Awards of 2010
|Good Gracious 
| Best Independent Hip Hop/Urban Album
| 
|-

ARIA Music Awards
The ARIA Music Awards is an annual awards ceremony that recognises excellence, innovation, and achievement across all genres of Australian music. M-Phazes has won two awards from six nominations.

|-
| 2010
| Good Gracious
| Best Urban Album 
| 
|-
| rowspan="2"| 2016
| rowspan="2"| "Papercuts" by Illy (featuring Vera Blue)
| Producer of the Year
| 
|-
| Engineer of the Year
| 
|-
| rowspan="2"| 2018
| rowspan="2"| "I Said Hi" by Amy Shark (with Dann Hume)
| Producer of the Year
| 
|-
| Engineer of the Year
| 
|-
| 2020
| Free Time by Ruel
| Producer of the Year
| 
|-
| 2021
| Cry Forever by Amy Shark, 'The Space Between by Illy and T.R.U.T.H.'' by Guy Sebastian
| Producer of the Year
| 
|-

National Live Music Awards
The National Live Music Awards (NLMAs) are a broad recognition of Australia's diverse live industry, celebrating the success of the Australian live scene. The awards commenced in 2016.

|-
| National Live Music Awards of 2017
| himself
| Live Instrumentalist of the Year
| 
|-

Discography

Solo albums

Writing and production credits

References

External links
M-Phazes Official website

1983 births
APRA Award winners
Australian hip hop musicians
Australian male rappers
Australian record producers
Australian hip hop DJs
Place of birth missing (living people)
Hip hop record producers
Living people
Musicians from Gold Coast, Queensland
Obese Records artists
Rappers from Melbourne